The Nothing Phone 1, stylised as Phone (1), is an  Android smartphone by Nothing Technology Ltd. The phone was announced on 23 March 2022 and went on sale on 21 July 2022.

History
Nothing was founded in 2020 and the phone (1) was code named Spacewar. It was announced on January 27, 2021, by former OnePlus co-founder Carl Pei, months after Pei left OnePlus. The goal of the new company was to "remove barriers between people and technology to create a seamless digital future." While no product was announced at the time, the company announced that new products from the company will be released later in the year. 

After Nothing released their first product, the ear (1), Nothing announced a partnership with Qualcomm, which will allow them to use their Snapdragon chips in their future devices.

Speculation on Nothing's first smartphone began to rise in March 2022 during the Mobile World Congress in Barcelona when the company showed its prototype to executives, including Qualcomm. After securing up to $70 million in Series B Financing, Nothing announced its March 23 keynote, at which it announced its first smartphone.

On June 20, 2022, Nothing revealed the design of the Nothing Phone (1) at The Art Basel Show in Basel, Switzerland. Nothing also confirmed on that another event will take place on July 12 to announce additional information regarding the Phone (1), including pricing and specs.

On July 12, 2022, the phone was released during an online event.

Release
Nothing has announced partnerships with O2 in the United Kingdom, Deutsche Telekom in Germany, and Flipkart in India to release the phone, with the phone to release exclusively in the UK on O2 and Germany on Deutsche Telekom. When asked about releasing the phone to the North American market, the company confirmed that the phone will not be released in North America. Although the company has confirmed that Nothing has plans to release a smartphone for the North American market, the phone (1) will instead be distributed to private investors through a closed beta program.

Pre-orders for the UK and Germany began on June 24, 2022, via invitation only with private community members going first, with customers who wanted to pre-order the phone required to pay £20/€20 in order to purchase the phone by July. In January 2023, Nothing announced a United States launch as a "beta program" to test the release of Android 13 on the device; "beta members" will pay US$299 and receive a phone with limited connectivity on US networks.

Design

The phone (1) features a transparent design, similar to that of its other product, the Nothing ear (1). This means that the user can see the internal components of the device, giving something that is considered to be "a very distinct and iconic design language of our own." The phone consists of 400 components. It has flat sides, similar to the iPhone 12. It has an IP53 splash, water and dust resistance rating.

The design features 900 small LEDs on the back which uses the Glyph Interface to make rear LEDs light up in sync with the phone sounds. These 'glyph lights' also light up to show the phone's charging status. The phone's frame consists of recycled aluminum with addition plastic components that are 50% made from bio-based or post-consumer recycled materials. The display is protected by Gorilla Glass 5 and the phone is covered with Gorilla Glass 6. There is an in-display fingerprint sensor as well.

The phone has stereo speakers, but does not come with a headphone jack. The phone supports Bluetooth 5.2 and NFC capabilities. The phone comes in white and black colours.

Hardware
The phone (1) is powered by the Qualcomm Snapdragon 778G+ processor and has a 6.5 inch 1080 x 2400 resolution punch hole display screen with 120 Hz refresh rate. The screen can get as bright as 1200 nits and supports displaying 1 billion colours. The phone has a 4500 mAh battery, with 33W charging, which is capable of charging the phone from 0 to 50% in 30 minutes and a full charge in 70 minutes.It also features 15W wireless charging, 5W reverse-wireless charging, and supports Quick Charge 4.0 and Power Delivery 3.0 up to 33W. It can be configured with either 8+128, 8+256, or 12+256 RAM and storage configurations.

The phone has dual 50-megapixel main and ultra-wide cameras. The main camera supports both optical image stabilization and electronic image stabilization and is capable of recording 4K video at 30 fps and FHD video at 60 fps. The phone does not have a dedicated telephoto lens, and instead uses digital zoom to take close-up shots. There is a red LED on the back of the phone that lights up when video is recorded.

Software
The phone (1) runs on Nothing OS, a new operating system based on the Android operating system. The operating system will be built on an ecosystem that can connect and integrate Nothing products and products from other brands. Nothing OS was tested and found to be near-stock Android, with some tweaks to ensure that the phone would provide "a fast, smooth, and personal experience." The phone will receive at least three years of software updates and four years of security updates.

Reception 
Engadget named the phone 'a very remarkable Android mid-ranger'. The attention to detail in the phone was praised. Overall, they gave it a rating of 88/100.

CNET praised the affordable and flashy design of the phone, along with the solid performance and camera, although they felt the battery life was a bit too short. The Nothing phone (1) received a rating of 8.5/10 from them.

A number of early purchasers though have complained about green tinting and dead pixels on their screens. Nothing stated that they would recalibrate the display effect in an upcoming software update and encouraged affected customers to contact customer support and request replacements.

Nothing Phone (1) received a very low repairability score of 3 out of 10 in a video review.

References

External links

Nothing smartphones
Android (operating system) devices
Mobile phones introduced in 2022
Mobile phones with multiple rear cameras
Mobile phones with 4K video recording